The European Heavyweight Championship is a name used for various top titles competed for throughout the European professional wrestling circuit.

The title was recognised as official by UK national TV network ITV for the purposes of their coverage of the UK wrestling scene and by its listings magazine TVTimes in accompanying magazine feature coverage.

The title was defended in many promotions in Europe, and other versions of this one title also appeared in certain promotions. On August 25, 2001 the European Wrestling Union produced a European Heavyweight Championship tournament in Bochum, Germany, bringing in wrestlers some of whom claimed to already be the champion. This tournament saw these titles merge into one with Britain's Robbie Brookside confirming his claim as champion by defeating American "Five Star" Cory K in a championship decider.

The title history below shows all the holders of the title in chronological order. However, there are instances where another wrestler has taken the role of champion, or claimed the title but no official title change was recorded (these are noted with "unknown title history", or other details.)

Title history

BWA European Heavyweight Championship history 
The European Heavyweight Championship is a professional wrestling championship owned by British Wrestling Association.

}}

FFCP European Heavyweight Championship history 
The European Heavyweight Championship is a professional wrestling championship owned by Fédération Française de Catch Professionnel.

Corporación Internacional de Catch (Spain) European Heavyweight Championship history 
The European Heavyweight Championship is a professional wrestling championship.

JP European Heavyweight Championship history 
The European Heavyweight Championship is a professional wrestling championship owned by Joint Promotions.

ASW European Heavyweight Championship history 
The European Heavyweight Championship is a professional wrestling championship owned by All Star Wrestling.

FCW European Heavyweight Championship history 
The European Heavyweight Championship is a professional wrestling championship owned by Freestyle Championship Wrestling.

FWA European Heavyweight Championship history 
The European Heavyweight Championship is a professional wrestling championship owned by Frontier Wrestling Alliance.

ICWA / NWA European Heavyweight Championship history 
The European Heavyweight Championship is a professional wrestling championship owned by International Catch Wrestling Alliance.

UEWA European Heavyweight Championship history 
The European Heavyweight Championship is a professional wrestling championship owned by Union of European Wrestling Alliances.

See also 

 European Greco-Roman Heavyweight Championship
 NXT United Kingdom Championship
 WWE European Championship

References

External links 
 wrestling-titles.com

Heavyweight wrestling championships
Continental professional wrestling championships